Trần Văn Khiêm is the younger brother of Madame Ngô Đình Nhu, the former First Lady of South Vietnam, and a South Vietnamese politician, lawyer and public servant. He
was a press officer for South Vietnamese President Ngô Đình Diệm.

Political career

In 1963, during the Buddhist crisis, with relations between the United States and South Vietnam deteriorating, Khiêm drew up a hit list of American officials.
In the September 1963 legislative elections, Khiêm stood for the National Assembly for a seat in Vĩnh Long, which he subsequently won. At the same time, he was estranged from his sister and her husband, who suspected him of handing over sensitive information about the government.

Family
He had a child with Mireille Sautereau named Pierre in Paris.

Criminal charges

In 1986, Khiêm was charged with killing his parents, Trần Văn Chuơng and Madame Chuơng, in their Washington, D.C. home. Chuơng had been South Vietnam's ambassador to the United States and observer at the United Nations during the reign of his daughter's brother-in-law, Ngô Đình Diệm. Khiêm was ruled unfit for trial on grounds of mental incompetence.

Deportation

In 1993, then 68, he was released from St. Elizabeths Hospital, when D.C. Superior Court Judge Curtis E. von Kann ruled that he will never be competent to assist in his defense. Immigration Judge John Milo Bryant ordered that Khiem be deported, and  Immigration and Naturalization Service officials took him to Dulles International Airport, where he boarded a flight to France.

References

External links
A Journey From Glory to the Grave : Prominent Vietnamese Family's Saga Began in Palace, May End in Court in the Wake of a Double Death

Vietnamese emigrants to the United States
Vietnamese anti-communists
Members of the National Assembly (South Vietnam)
Place of birth missing (living people)
Year of birth missing (living people)
People deported from the United States
Vietnamese emigrants to France
Living people